The United States census of 1840 was the sixth census of the United States. Conducted by the Census Office on June 1, 1840, it determined the resident population of the United States to be 17,069,453 – an increase of 32.7 percent over the 12,866,020 persons enumerated during the 1830 census. The total population included 2,487,355 slaves.  In 1840, the center of population was about 260 miles (418 km) west of Washington, near Weston, Virginia (now in West Virginia).

This was the first census in which:
 A state recorded a population of over two million (New York)
 A city recorded a population of over 300,000 (New York)
 Multiple cities recorded populations of over 100,000 (New York, Baltimore, and New Orleans)

Controversy over statistics for mental illness among Northern blacks
The 1840 census was the first that attempted to count Americans who were "insane" or "idiotic". Published results of the census indicated that alarming numbers of black persons living in non-slaveholding States were mentally ill, in striking contrast to the corresponding figures for slaveholding States.

Pro-slavery advocates trumpeted the results as evidence of the beneficial effects of slavery, and the probable consequences of emancipation. Anti-slavery advocates contended, on the contrary, that the published returns were riddled with errors, as detailed in an 1844 report by Edward Jarvis of Massachusetts in the American Journal of the Medical Sciences, later published separately as a pamphlet, and in a memorial from the American Statistical Association to Congress, praying that measures be taken to correct the errors.

The memorial was submitted to the House of Representatives by John Quincy Adams, who contended that it demonstrated "a multitude of gross and important errors" in the published returns. In response to the House's request for an inquiry, Secretary of State John C. Calhoun reported that a careful examination of the statistics by the supervisor of the census had fully sustained their correctness. The returns were not revised.

Census questions

The 1840 census asked these questions:
 Name of head of family
 Address
 Number of free white males and females
 in five-year age groups to age 20
 in 10-year age groups from 20 to 100
 100 years and older
 number of slaves and free colored persons in six age groups
 number of deaf and dumb, by race
 number of blind, by race
 number of insane and idiotic in public or private charge, by race
 number of persons in each family employed in seven classes of occupation
 number of schools and number of scholars
 number of white persons over 20 who could not read and write
 number of pensioners for Revolutionary or military service

Data availability
No microdata from the 1840 population census are available, but aggregate data for small areas, together with compatible cartographic boundary files, can be downloaded from the National Historical Geographic Information System.  A compendium of data from the sixth census, organized by States, counties, and principal towns is available on the web site of the Census Bureau.

State rankings

City rankings

References

External links
 "1840 census: False count on insanity showed slavery was good for Blacks" by Peter Whoriskey, The Washington Post, October 17 2020
 Compendium of the Enumeration of the Inhabitants and Statistics of the United States . . . from the Returns of the Sixth Census .... (Washington, D.C., 1841)
 Overview of the 1840 Census on www.census.gov.
 1840 U.S. Federal Census  Online Records and Indexes on www.cyndislist.com (21 Links)  Includes links to sites with any or all of the following: digitized images, indexes, transcriptions, extractions, abstracts, and partial or whole copies of census materials.

United States Census, 1840
United States census
United States